Ruby Peak may refer to:

 Ruby Peak (South Georgia Island)
 Ruby Peak (California)
 A peak in the Ruby Range, Montana

See also
 Ruby Dome, a mountain in Nevada
 Ruby Mountain, in California